Edjaun Sinclair "E. J." Biggers (born June 13, 1987) is a former American football cornerback that played in the National Football League (NFL). He played college football at Western Michigan University, and was drafted by the Tampa Bay Buccaneers in the seventh round of the 2009 NFL Draft. Biggers also played for the Washington Redskins, Philadelphia Eagles, and New England Patriots.

High school career

Biggers played both quarterback and cornerback, and was a three-year starter for the North Miami Beach High School Chargers football team. As a senior, he was named Dade County Player of the Year. Despite this honor and his obvious athletic talent, he was not highly recruited in his home state of Florida. Biggers was offered scholarships from Iowa, Kansas, Ohio State, and Penn State before ultimately deciding to attend Western Michigan.

College career

As a true freshman in 2005, Biggers appeared in nine games for Western Michigan and started three. In his sophomore season, he started all 12 of the Broncos' games, and recorded interceptions in three consecutive games. At the end of the season, playing in his first bowl game (against the Cincinnati Bearcats in the inaugural International Bowl), Biggers played some snaps on offense, and in the second half on a double reverse trick play, he threw his first career pass, which went for a 76-yard touchdown.

Biggers would go on to start all 25 games for the Broncos in his junior and senior years. Despite over three full seasons as a starter and being named to the All-MAC team his senior year, he did not receive an invitation to the NFL Scouting Combine. His impressive showing at Western Michigan's pro day (including a 4.34 in the 40-yard dash and a 36-inch vertical jump) caught the attention of NFL scouts.

Professional career

Tampa Bay Buccaneers
Biggers was selected with the eighth pick in the seventh round of the 2009 NFL Draft by the Tampa Bay Buccaneers. Biggers had a promising training camp, but injured his shoulder in practice during the first week of the regular season, and was placed on injured reserve for the remainder of the year.

Biggers made his NFL debut in 2010 when he started in Tampa's Week 1 matchup against the Cleveland Browns for a suspended Aqib Talib. Biggers not only recorded his first tackle in the NFL (and finished the game with six), but also got his first NFL interception against the Browns' veteran QB Jake Delhomme.

Washington Redskins

Biggers signed with the Washington Redskins on March 20, 2013, joining the team on a one-year, $1.5 million deal. The Redskins used him as both a corner and safety, Biggers never playing the latter in his professional career. He recorded his first interception with the Redskins in their Week 9 win against the San Diego Chargers. After the Week 11 game against the Philadelphia Eagles, he was fined $21,000 for a helmet-to-helmet hit on wide receiver DeSean Jackson.

Philadelphia Eagles
On April 7, 2015, the Philadelphia Eagles announced that they signed Biggers to a one-year deal.

New England Patriots
On March 29, 2016, the New England Patriots signed Biggers to a one-year deal.

On August 23, 2016, Biggers was released by the Patriots.

References

External links

Washington Redskins bio
Tampa Bay Buccaneers bio
Western Michigan Broncos bio

1987 births
Living people
North Miami Senior High School alumni
Players of American football from Miami
American football cornerbacks
American football safeties
Western Michigan Broncos football players
Tampa Bay Buccaneers players
Washington Redskins players
Philadelphia Eagles players
New England Patriots players